Penn Medicine station (formerly University City station) is a train station in the University City section of Philadelphia, Pennsylvania on the SEPTA Regional Rail system. The station serves the area around the University of Pennsylvania, and is located at South Street and Convention Avenue. Located on the West Chester Branch, it serves the Airport, Wilmington/Newark, Media/Wawa, Manayunk/Norristown, Warminster, and West Trenton Regional Rail services.  In 2013, this station saw 3,091 boardings and 2,950 alightings on an average weekday.

The station is less than a block from the University of Pennsylvania's Franklin Field and the Palestra. It is one block away from the medical campuses of the Hospital of the University of Pennsylvania and the Children's Hospital of Philadelphia. The rest of the University of Pennsylvania campus, Drexel University campus, and the Graduate Hospital campus and the neighborhood across the Schuylkill River are also nearby and easily accessible.

History
University City station was conceived in 1979 by the City of Philadelphia as Civic Center, under which name it appeared (as "proposed") on SEPTA informational maps of the 1980s. That name was no longer relevant by the time construction began in 1991. The station instead opened with the regionally descriptive name of University City on April 24, 1995.

The station has a blue and red color scheme, a nod to Penn's colors.

On January 27, 2020, SEPTA announced that the station would be renamed Penn Medicine Station after selling naming rights to Penn Medicine for $3.3 million in a 5-year deal.

Routes served 
Since its inception, the station has been a stop for all trains on the five SEPTA rail lines which pass through the station, including rush-hour express trains on the Wilmington/Newark and Media/Wawa lines; thus it has a high level of service at all times. Even though not all lines serve it, Penn Medicine is listed in timetables and other SEPTA literature as one of the five Center City Philadelphia (CCP) stations, and falls within the CCP Regional Rail fare zone.

The station is also served by SEPTA bus route 40 which runs along South Street, and bus routes 30, 42, 49, and the LUCY Green Loop from the nearby corner of Convention Avenue and Health Sciences Drive.

In popular culture
The station made a brief appearance in the movie Unbreakable as Elijah (Samuel L. Jackson) falls down the stairs to the platform. It is portrayed as a subway station with turnstiles in the movie, though in reality; the station had no turnstiles at the time of filming, as "Rotogate" turnstiles were installed at the Spruce St. entrance in May 2017 in preparation for SEPTA Key Deployment on Regional Rail. The Convention Avenue entrance has regular height turnstiles and ADA gates.

Station layout
Penn Medicine has one high-level island platform serving both tracks.

Gallery

References

External links
SEPTA - Penn Medicine Station
Station House from Google Maps Street View

SEPTA Regional Rail stations
Stations on the West Chester Line
Railway stations in Philadelphia
Railway stations in Pennsylvania at university and college campuses
Railway stations in the United States opened in 1995
Wilmington/Newark Line